Glasner is a surname. Notable people with the surname include:

Björn Glasner (born 1973), German cyclist
Matthias Glasner (born 1965), German film director
Moshe Shmuel Glasner (1856–1924), Hungarian Talmudic scholar and rabbi
Oliver Glasner (born 1974), Austrian footballer and manager
Sebastian Glasner (born 1985), German footballer